

Gabon
 Jim Allevinah – Clermont – 2021–
 Pierre Aubameyang – Laval, Le Havre – 1984–89, 1991–94
 Pierre-Emerick Aubameyang – Lille OSC, AS Monaco, Saint-Étienne – 2009–13
 Stéphane Bégou – Toulon – 1983–84
 André Biyogo Poko – Bordeaux – 2011–16
 Denis Bouanga – Lorient, Nîmes, Saint-Étienne – 2014–16, 2018–22
 Moïse Brou Apanga – Brest – 2010–12
 Frédéric Bulot – Monaco, Caen, Reims – 2010–12, 2015–16
 Daniel Cousin – Lens – 2005–08
 Alan Do Marcolino – Rennes – 2022–
 Bruno Ecuele Manga – Lorient, Dijon – 2010–14, 2019–21
 Mario Lemina – Lorient, Marseille, Nice – 2012–16, 2021–23
 Paul Manon – Reims – 1966–67
 Régis Manon – Tours – 1984–85
 Kevin Mayi – Saint-Étienne, Gazélec Ajaccio, Brest – 2011–13, 2015–16, 2019–20
 Anthony Mfa Mezui – Metz – 2014–15
 Eric Mouloungui – Strasbourg, Nice – 2002–06, 2007–12
 Yrondu Musavu-King – Caen, Lorient, Toulouse – 2014–17
 Stéphane N'Guéma – Rennes – 2002–07
 Shiva N'Zigou – Nantes – 2002–04
 Didier Ndong – Lorient, Guingamp, Dijon – 2014–17, 2018–21
 Guy Roger Nzamba – Auxerre – 1992–93
Johann Obiang – Troyes – 2017–18
 Mondey Ossey – Rennes, Toulouse FC (1937) – 1959–61
 Didier Ovono – Le Mans – 2009–10
 Lloyd Palun – Nice – 2010–15
 Yoann Wachter – Lorient – 2014–15

Gambia
Ablie Jallow – Metz – 2017–18
Saidy Janko – Saint-Étienne – 2017–18

Georgia
 Otar Dondua – Red Star – 1945–48
 Gija Guruli – Le Havre – 1992–94
 Jaba Kankava – Reims – 2015–16
 Giorgi Makaridze – Le Mans – 2009–10
Georges Mikautadze – Metz – 2019–20, 2021–22

Germany
 Klaus Allofs – Marseille, Bordeaux – 1987–91
 Thomas Allofs – Strasbourg – 1989–90
 Oliver Bierhoff – Monaco – 2001–02
 Jérôme Boateng – Lyon – 2021–
 Emile Buhrer – Metz – 1932–33, 1935–36
 Kurt Clemens – FC Nancy – 1951–53
 Diego Contento – Bordeaux – 2014–18
 Karl Dahleimer – Fives – 1933–38
 Julian Draxler – Paris SG – 2016–
 Ewald Follmann – Metz – 1949–50
 Karl-Heinz Förster – Marseille – 1986–90
 Dieter Hackl – Strasbourg – 1969–71, 1972–73
 Walter Hanke – Metz – 1935–37
 Paul-Ferdinand Heidkamp – Bastia, Lille OSC – 1973–77
 Wilhelm Heiss – Marseille – 1937–39
Benjamin Henrichs – Monaco – 2018–20
 Otto Herbert – Le Havre – 1945–47
 Bernd Hobsch – Rennes – 1997–98
 Udo Horsmann – Rennes – 1983–84
 Reinhold Jackstell – Lens, Angers – 1953–54, 1956–57
 Klaus-Dieter Jank – Laval – 1983–84
Moritz Jenz – Lorient – 2021–
 Walter Kaiser – Rennes – 1932–37
 Manfred Kaltz – Bordeaux, Mulhouse – 1988–90
 Wolfgang Kaniber – Strasbourg – 1969–71
 Thilo Kehrer – Paris SG – 2018–22
 Walter Kelsch – Strasbourg – 1984–86
 Jürgen Klinsmann – AS Monaco – 1992–94
 Harald Klose – Valenciennes – 1970–71, 1972–73
 Andreas Köpke – Marseille – 1996–98
 Erwin Kostedde – Laval – 1979–80
 Peter Kracke – Angoulême – 1971–72
 Uwe Krause – Laval, Monaco, Sochaux – 1980–86
 Willibald Kreß – Mulhouse – 1932–33
 Mustafa Kučuković – Grenoble – 2009–10
 Edmund Kunkelmann – Strasbourg – 1951–52
 Herbert Laumen – Metz – 1974–75
 Bernd Lehmann – Strasbourg – 1975–76
 Reinhard Libuda – Strasbourg – 1972–73
 Kurt Linder – Lyon – 1962–63
 Pierre Littbarski – RC Paris – 1986–87
 Erich Maas – Nantes – 1970–75
 Caspar Memering – Bordeaux – 1982–84
 Franz Michelberger – Reims – 1978–79
 Arno Motschmann – Mulhouse, Valenciennes – 1932–33, 1935–36
 Dieter Müller – Bordeaux – 1982–85
 Norbert Nachtweih – Cannes – 1989–91
 Alexander Nübel – Monaco – 2021–
 Albert Osswald – Strasbourg – 1951–52
 Thomas Pfannkuch – Lyon – 1991–92
 Julian Pollersbeck – Lyon – 2021–
 Fritz Raemer – Rennes – 1932–33
 Peter Reichert – Strasbourg, Toulouse FC – 1988–90
 Uwe Reinders – Bordeaux, Rennes – 1985–87
 Herbert Renner – Strasbourg – 1968–69
 Gernot Rohr – Bordeaux – 1977–89
 Oskar Rohr – Strasbourg – 1934–39
 Paul Schnoek – Marseille, SC Nîmes – 1932–35
 Alfred Schön – Nancy – 1991–92
 Dieter Schurr – Strasbourg – 1969–71
 Thomas Seeliger – Nancy – 1991–92
 Karl-Heinz Spikofski – CO Roubaix-Tourcoing – 1952–54
 Heinz Stickel – Nancy – 1978–79
 Siegfried Susser – Strasbourg – 1983–84
 Kevin Trapp – Paris SG – 2015–18
 Georg Tripp – Metz, Sedan – 1969–71
 Kevin Volland – Monaco – 2020–
 Rudi Völler – Marseille – 1992–94
 Walter Vollweiler – Rennes – 1933–36
 Patrick Weiser – Rennes – 1997–99
 Roland Wohlfarth – Saint-Étienne – 1993–95
 Andreas Wolf – Monaco – 2013–14
 Christian Wörns – Paris SG – 1998–99

Ghana
Salis Abdul Samed – Clermont, Lens – 2021–
 Geoffrey Acheampong – Bastia – 2016–17
 Ishmael Addo – Bastia – 2001–02
 André Ayew – Marseille, Lorient – 2007–09, 2010–15
 Jordan Ayew – Marseille, Sochaux, Lorient – 2009–15
 Abdul Rahman Baba – Reims – 2018–19
 Anthony Baffoe – Metz, Nice – 1992–95
 John Boye – Rennes, Metz – 2011–14, 2019–21
 Alexander Djiku – Bastia, Caen, Strasbourg – 2014–
 Eben Dugbatey – Lorient – 1998–99
 Michael Essien – Bastia, Lyon – 2000–05
 Asamoah Gyan – Rennes – 2008–11
 Samuel Inkoom – Bastia – 2012–13
 Gideon Mensah – Bordeaux, Auxerre – 2021–
 John Mensah – Rennes, Lyon – 2005–09, 2011–13
 Arthur Moses – Marseille – 1997–99
 Moussa Narry – Auxerre, Le Mans – 2008–10
 Kwame Nsor – Metz – 2014–15
 Alex Nyarko – Lens, AS Monaco, Paris SG – 1998–2003
Nicholas Opoku – Amiens – 2019–20
 Abedi Pele – Marseille, Lille, Lyon – 1987–94
 Abeiku Quansah – Nice – 2008–11
Alidu Seidu – Clermont – 2021–
Kamaldeen Sulemana – Rennes – 2021–23
 Alhassan Wakaso – Lorient – 2016–17
 Abdul Majeed Waris – Lorient, Nantes, Strasbourg – 2015–17, 2018–22
 Yaw Yeboah – Lille – 2015–16

Greece
Angelos Basinas – Arles-Avignon – 2010–11
Angelos Charisteas – Arles-Avignon – 2010–11
Georges Chrysantis – Strasbourg – 1937–38
Filippos Darlas – Brest – 2010–11
Anastasios Donis – Nice, Reims – 2016–17, 2019–
Michalis Kapsis – Bordeaux – 2004–05
Victor Klonaridis – Lille – 2012–13
Efthymis Koulouris – Toulouse – 2019–20
Kostas Mitroglou – Marseille – 2017–19
Marinos Ouzounidis – Le Havre – 1997–99
Panagiotis Retsos – Saint-Étienne – 2020–21
Efstathios Tavlaridis – Lille, Saint-Étienne – 2004–10
Guy-Victor Thomaïdis – Olympique Lillois – 1936–38
Theocharis Tsingaras – Toulouse – 2022–
Akis Zikos – AS Monaco – 2002–06

Guadeloupe
Note: As it is an overseas department of the French Republic, Guadeloupean players listed here must also have played with the Guadeloupe national team, which belongs to CONCACAF, although it is not a member of FIFA.
 Alexandre Alphonse – Brest – 2011–12
 Mickaël Alphonse – Dijon, Ajaccio – 2018–20, 2022–
 Jocelyn Angloma – Lille, Paris SG, Marseille – 1989–94
Cédric Avinel – Ajaccio – 2022–
Claudio Beauvue – Bastia, Guingamp, Lyon, Caen – 2012–16, 2018–19
Flavien Belson – Metz – 2005–06, 2007–08
Aurélien Capoue – Nantes, Auxerre – 2004–07, 2008–10
Pascal Chimbonda – Le Havre; Bastia – 1999–2000, 2002–05
Cédric Collet – Sedan – 2002–03
Philippe Durpes – Lens – 1992–93, 1995–97
Olivier Fauconnier – Le Havre, Nice, Ajaccio – 2002–03, 2004–05
Dimitri Foulquier – Rennes, Strasbourg – 2011–14, 2017–18
 Andreaw Gravillon – Lorient, Reims – 2020–
Brice Jovial – Dijon – 2011–12
Rémy Labeau Lascary – Lens – 2022–
Jordan Leborgne – Caen – 2015–18
Ulick Lupede – Le Mans – 2003–04
Livio Nabab – Caen – 2008–09, 2010–12
Lenny Nangis – Caen, Lille, Bastia – 2011–12, 2014–17
Loïc Nestor – Le Havre – 2008–09
Therry Racon – Marseille – 2003–04
Richard Socrier – Metz, Ajaccio – 2004–05, 2011–12
 David Sommeil – Caen, Rennes, Bordeaux, Marseille, Valenciennes – 1993–95, 1996–97, 1998–2004, 2007–09
 Mickaël Tacalfred – Stade Reims – 2012–16
 Yohann Thuram-Ulien – Monaco, Troyes – 2008–10, 2012–13
 Ronald Zubar – Caen, Marseille, Ajaccio – 2004–05, 2006–09, 2012–14

Guinea
 Abdallah Bah – Nice – 1995–96
 Mamadou Bah – Strasbourg – 2007–08
 Schuman Bah – Metz – 2000–03
 Bobo Baldé – Toulouse FC, Valenciennes – 2000–01, 2009–11
 Abdoulkarim Bangoura – Martigues – 1994–96
 Amara Karba Bangoura – Valenciennes – 2008–10
 Ibrahima Bangoura – Troyes – 2001–03, 2005–07
 Ismaël Bangoura – Le Mans, Rennes, FC Nantes – 2005–07, 2009–11, 2013–16
 Mohamed Bayo – Clermont, Lille – 2021–
 Abdoul Camara – Rennes, Sochaux, Angers SCO – 2009–14, 2015–16
 Demba Camara – AC Ajaccio – 2013–14
 Ibrahima Camara – Le Mans – 2006–10
 Mo Camara – Le Havre – 1997–98
 Mohamed Camara – Troyes – 2012–13
 Ousmane Camara – Auxerre – 2022–
 Titi Camara – Saint-Étienne, Lens, Marseille – 1990–99
 Kévin Constant – Toulouse FC – 2007–08
 Antoine Conte – Paris SG, Reims  – 2012–16
 Mouctar Diakhaby – Lyon – 2016–18
 Ibrahim Diakité – Reims – 2021–
 Mamadou Diallo – Sochaux – 2012–13
 Sadio Diallo – Rennes, Lorient, Bastia – 2012–17
 Kaba Diawara – Bordeaux, Rennes, Marseille, Paris SG, Nice, Ajaccio, Arles-Avignon – 1996–2000, 2002–06, 2010–11
 Simon Falette – Lorient, Metz – 2011–12, 2016–18
 Pascal Feindouno – Bordeaux, Lorient, Saint-Étienne – 1998–2009
 Simon Feindouno – Lens – 2007–08
Serhou Guirassy – Lille, Amiens, Rennes – 2015–16, 2018–
 Daouda Jabi – Lens, Ajaccio – 2000–06
 Julian Jeanvier – Nancy, Auxerre – 2012–13, 2022–
 Sory Kaba – Dijon – 2018–19
 Oumar Kalabane – Auxerre – 2005–07
François Kamano – Bastia, Bordeaux – 2014–20
Jules Keita – Dijon – 2018–20
 Bengali-Fodé Koita – Montpellier, Caen – 2009–12, 2014–15
 Guy-Michel Landel – Le Mans – 2009–10
 Fodé Mansaré – Montpellier, Toulouse FC – 2001–04, 2005–11
Mohamed Mara – Lorient – 2016–17
 Mamadou N'Diaye – Lille OSC – 1971–72
Florentin Pogba – Saint-Étienne – 2013–18
Baïssama Sankoh – Guingamp, Caen – 2013–15, 2016–19
 Ernest Seka – Strasbourg – 2017–18
 Michel Soumah – Limoges – 1960–61
 Morlaye Soumah – Bastia – 1995-2003
 Ousmane Soumah – Bastia, Lorient – 1994–2002
 Richard Soumah – Brest – 2010–13
 Abdelsalem Sow – Martigues – 1995–96
 Saïdou Sow – Saint-Étienne – 2020–22
 Abdoulaye Sylla – Nantes – 2021–22
 Issiaga Sylla – Toulouse FC, Gazélec Ajaccio, Lens, Montpellier – 2012–21, 2022–
 Mohammed Sylla – Martigues – 1995–96
 Mohammed Sylla – Le Havre – 1998–99
 Larsen Touré – Lille OSC, Grenoble, Brest – 2005–06, 2007–13
 Mady Touré – Brest – 1982–85
Amadou Traoré – Bordeaux – 2020–22
 Abdoulaye Yansané – Aix – 1967–68
 Souleymane Youla – Metz, Lille OSC – 2005–08
 Kamil Zayatte – Lens – 2005–06

Guinea–Bissau
 Mama Baldé – Dijon, Troyes – 2019–
 Bocundji Cá – Nantes, AS Nancy – 2004–07, 2009–10
 Fali Candé – Metz – 2021–22
 Basile de Carvalho – Sochaux – 2002–05
 Moreto Cassamá – Reims – 2019–22
 Edmilson Correia – Saint-Étienne – 2019–20
 Esmaël Gonçalves – Nice – 2010–12
 Edgar Ié – Lille, Nantes – 2017–19
 Jorginho – Saint-Étienne – 2016–17
 Houboulang Mendes – Lorient – 2021–22
 Alexandre Mendy – Nice, Guingamp, Bordeaux, Brest – 2015–20
 Judilson Pelé – Monaco – 2018–19

References and notes

Books

Club pages
AJ Auxerre former players
AJ Auxerre former players
Girondins de Bordeaux former players
Girondins de Bordeaux former players
Les ex-Tangos (joueurs), Stade Lavallois former players
Olympique Lyonnais former players
Olympique de Marseille former players
FC Metz former players
AS Monaco FC former players
Ils ont porté les couleurs de la Paillade... Montpellier HSC Former players
AS Nancy former players
FC Nantes former players
Paris SG former players
Red Star Former players
Red Star former players
Stade de Reims former players
Stade Rennais former players
CO Roubaix-Tourcoing former players
AS Saint-Étienne former players
Sporting Toulon Var former players

Others
stat2foot
footballenfrance
French Clubs' Players in European Cups 1955-1995, RSSSF
Finnish players abroad, RSSSF
Italian players abroad, RSSSF
Romanians who played in foreign championships
Swiss players in France, RSSSF
EURO 2008 CONNECTIONS: FRANCE, Stephen Byrne Bristol Rovers official site

References

Notes

France
 
Association football player non-biographical articles